Seneleleni Ndwandwe (a.k.a. Seneleni Nxumalo) (died 1980) was Ndlovukati (Queen mother) of Swaziland during the reign of Sobhuza II. She was full sister and co-wife to her predecessor, Zihlati Ndwandwe.

References

1980 deaths
Year of birth missing
Swazi royalty